James Findlay Stephen (23 August 1922 – 5 November 2012) was a Scottish footballer who played as a defender. At club level, he played in the Football League for Bradford (Park Avenue) and Portsmouth. He also played in two full international matches for Scotland.

Stephen signed for Bradford when he left school in 1938, and turned professional the following year. During the Second World War he made guest appearances for clubs including Halifax Town, Middlesbrough and Huddersfield Town. He left Bradford for Portsmouth in 1949, although National Service in the RAF meant he was restricted to a solitary appearance in the Portsmouth team that won the 1949–50 League title. He finished his career in non-league football with Yeovil Town before becoming a player-coach at Bridgwater Town, Newport in the Isle of Wight, and Waterlooville

Having represented Scotland in five wartime internationals against England, Stephen made his full international debut as captain in the first competitive match Scotland played after the war, a 3–1 defeat to Wales on 19 October 1946 in the British Home Championship. His second and last cap came a year later, also against Wales.

See also
List of Scotland national football team captains
List of Scotland wartime international footballers

References

External links
 
 

1922 births
2012 deaths
People from Kincardine and Mearns
Scottish footballers
Scotland international footballers
Scotland wartime international footballers
Association football defenders
Bradford (Park Avenue) A.F.C. players
Portsmouth F.C. players
Yeovil Town F.C. players
Halifax Town A.F.C. wartime guest players
Middlesbrough F.C. wartime guest players
Huddersfield Town A.F.C. wartime guest players
English Football League players
Footballers from Aberdeenshire